People's Choice is Sledgeback's first full-length album, released in 2004 by Sliver records . The sound of the album is general punk rock.

Track listing
"Pants off" - 3:27
"Push Me Away" - 2:53
"Sledgeanger"3:37
"How far" - 3:25
"Don't wanna know " - 2:36
"Deal" - 0:29
"Heat" - 2:59
"Good by my friend" - 2:07
"Take me home" - 2:19
"No feelings" - 2:10
"Gimme back" - 3:02 
"Regret" - 2:57
"Seattle" - 2:17

Other
Track #1 "Pants off" has been recorded with Hungarian language "Utazas" ("Trip") and played live by the band C.A.F.B.. 
Track #6 is not a full song.
Track #13 is instrumental.

References
People's Choice on iTunes

Sledgeback albums
2004 debut albums